Adams Rocks is a pair of large rock outcrops that overlook the inner part of Block Bay from northward, located  west of Mount June, Phillips Mountains, in the Ford Ranges of Marie Byrd Land. Mapped by United States Antarctic Service (USAS) (1939–41) and by United States Geological Survey (USGS) from surveys and U.S. Navy air photos (1959–65). Named by Advisory Committee on Antarctic Names (US-ACAN) for James G. Adams, builder, U.S. Navy, of the Byrd Station party, 1967.

Features
Block Bay

References

Rock formations of Marie Byrd Land